Herbert H. Lehman High School is a public high school at 3000 East Tremont Avenue, in the Westchester Square section of the Bronx, New York City. The school is named after former New York State Governor Herbert Henry Lehman (1878–1963). The school is not affiliated with Lehman College in the Bronx, also named after the governor, but does hold its annual graduation ceremony there each June.

History
The school's first graduating class was in June 1974.

In late 2006 and early 2007 the school underwent an external renovation that included painting the entire building. Much of the work was done during the night to avoid disrupting classes.

Robert Leder was the school's second principal and had remained principal for most of its 37-year existence. After a New York City Department of Education's investigation of two assistant principals and abuse of overtime funds, Mr. Leder was given the choice to resign his post as principal at the end of the year, or be immediately removed and reassigned. His decision, amid a great deal of student and parent protest, was to resign effective June 30, 2008.

The new executive principal, appointed in July 2008, was Dr. Janet Saraceno, formerly the principal of High School for Media and Communications in Manhattan. After 3 years, Saraceno resigned due to student grade tampering, and was replaced by Mrs. Rose Lobianco, the former assistant principal of Columbus High School in the Bronx.

Athletics

Sports
Lehman offers a variety of athletic clubs and teams for the students. Its mascot is a lion and its colors are blue and orange. Its varsity football, baseball, soccer, track and field and wrestling teams have had success over the years.

Perhaps the most followed sport at Lehman is football. The former coach of Lehman's varsity football team, Carmine Colasanto, has been recognized as one of the PSAL's best coaches. He has recorded over 200 career victories and has been honored with numerous coach of the year awards. Coach Colasanto was the longest tenured coach in the PSAL until his resignation before the 2008 season. Some of the players Coach Colasanto had were former NFL players Doug Marrone(Head Coach at Syracuse University), Charles Puleri. Lehman football has produced numerous IA players and have sent alum to Tulane, Georgia Tech, Maryland, Syracuse and Cincinnati among numerous prominent schools. The football team is now led by the only woman head football coach in the PSAL, Ms Deborah Vance. Coach Vance had a successful run with the Junior Varsity and is now establishing her legacy with the varsity, leading Lehman from 1–8 to a 5–4 record and a playoff appearance in 2009. The school's varsity football team has been consistently ranked among the PSAL's best and has been in numerous Citywide championships. Junior varsity football is also offered and the team has also met with success in recent years, even managing to finish the 2007 season a perfect 8-0, and winning the New York City championship.

Lehman's soccer team won their first New York City Championship back in the PSAL B division in 2001 and made an appearance back to the finals in the PSAL A division in 2006, eventually falling against MLK Jr High School 4–0. Also in the 2009–2010 season, Lehman finished the Bronx A Division with a record of 9–0–3, an undefeated season although they finished second behind Christopher Columbus. Led by Coach Straw, Lehman has become one of the best teams in the Bronx alongside Christopher Columbus and Bronx Science. Since 2001, they have made it to the playoffs every season finishing in the top 4.

Logo and uniforms
Since its inception the school's colors have been orange and blue and the mascot the lion. The home football uniform consists of a Royal blue jersey with blue numbers outlined in white and orange piping with blue pants highlighted in orange and white. The road uniform is a white jersey with blue numbers outlined in orange with orange piping and it accompanies blue pants. The helmet is solid orange with a blue paw print on both sides.

The Baseball uniform consist of white pants with a blue and orange stripe down the pant legs. The jersey consist of a white top with an interlocking "HL" which is blue outlined in orange. The hat is all blue with an HL logo in white with orange outlining.

The basketball team also has representation within the PSAL but isn't as prominent as football, baseball, soccer or softball.

Collocated school
Renaissance High School for Musical Theater & Technology, Westchester Square Academy, Pelham Lab High School, Schuylerville Preparatory High School, & Bronx River High School are now co-located with Lehman on the 2nd, 3rd and 4th floor.

Notable alumni
Cardi B, (b 1992) - American rapper
Bobby Bonilla, (b 1963) - former MLB player for the Pittsburgh Pirates, New York Mets and Florida Marlins 
Larry Lawton, (b 1961) - is an American ex-convict, author, paralegal, motivational speaker, and YouTuber. 
Doug Marrone, (b 1964) - is an American football coach and former offensive lineman 
Tarana Burke, (b 1973) - American activist
 French Montana, (b 1984) - is a Moroccan-American rapper.
Desus Nice, (b 1981) - American television, YouTube, and Twitter personality.
T. J. Rivera, (b 1988) - American Baseball player for the New York Mets. 
Ritchie Torres, (b 1988) - New York City Council member and U.S. Representative
Monét X Change, (b 1990) - American drag queen, singer, and reality television personality

References

External links
Herbert H. Lehman High School
NYC Department of Education: Herbert H. Lehman High School
Review on insideschools.org

Public high schools in the Bronx
Educational institutions established in 1970
Westchester Square, Bronx